Carposina sublucida is a moth in the family Carposinidae. It is found on the Canary Islands.

The wingspan is about 13 mm for males and 14 mm for females. The forewings are whitish, dusted with small grey scales. The hindwings are whitish with a creamy gloss.

References

Carposinidae
Moths described in 1988